Rubell is a surname. Notable people with the surname include:

Jennifer Rubell (born 1970), American conceptual artist
Paul Rubell (born 1952), American film editor
Steve Rubell (1943–1989), American entrepreneur

See also
Rubel